Skogmo is a Norwegian surname. Notable people with the surname include:

Bjørn Skogmo (born 1940), Norwegian diplomat
George B. Skogmo (1880–1968), American politician
Jens Kristian Skogmo (born 1987), Norwegian footballer

Norwegian-language surnames